St John the Evangelist's Church, Hazelwood is a Grade II listed parish church in the Church of England in Hazelwood, Derbyshire.

History

The architect was Henry Isaac Stevens who drew up plans in 1844. It was funded through the efforts of Col. Colville of Duffield Hall. The church was consecrated on Ascension Day 1864 by the Bishop of Lichfield.
 
The church was badly damaged by a fire on 1 February 1902. It was re-opened on 2 December 1902 after a restoration costing £2,000 by Naylor and Sale of Derby.

Parish status
The church is in a joint parish with 
Holy Trinity Church, Milford
St Lawrence's Church, Shottle
St Michael's Church, Holbrook

Organ
After the fire in 1902 a new organ was supplied by Charles Lloyd of Nottingham.

See also
Listed buildings in Hazelwood, Derbyshire

References

Church of England church buildings in Derbyshire
Grade II listed churches in Derbyshire
Churches completed in 1846